Phi Aquarii, Latinized from φ Aquarii, is the Bayer designation for a binary star system in the equatorial constellation of Aquarius. It is visible to the naked eye with a combined apparent visual magnitude of +4.223. It is 1.05 degrees south of the ecliptic so it is subject to lunar occultations.

This is a spectroscopic binary star system with an estimated period of 2,500 days. The primary component is a red giant star with a stellar classification of M1.5 III. The outer envelope of this evolved star has expanded to 35 times the size of the Sun. The star has the same mass as the Sun. It is radiating 208 times the luminosity of the Sun at an effective temperature of 3,715 K, giving it the reddish hue of an M-type star.

References

External links
 Image Phi Aquarii

M-type giants
Spectroscopic binaries
Aquarius (constellation)
Aquarii, Phi
BD-06 6170
Aquarii, 090
219215
114724
8834